Disconnect may refer to:

Film and television
 Disconnect (2012 film), an American psychological drama film
 Disconnect (2018 film), a Kenyan romantic comedy film
 "Disconnect" (Prison Break), a 2006 television episode
 "The Disconnect", a 2005 episode of The O.C.

Music

Albums
 Disconnect (Iris album), 2000
 Disconnect (JES album), 2007
 Disconnect, by Helen Jane Long, 2022
 Disconnect, by Phantoms, 2019
 Disconnect, by Threat Signal, 2017

Songs
 "Disconnect" (Clean Bandit and Marina and the Diamonds song), 2017
 "Disconnect" (Rollins Band song), 1994
 "Disconnect", by 6lack from East Atlanta Love Letter, 2018
 "Disconnect", by Digital Summer from Cause and Effect, 2007
 "Disconnect", by Ima Robot from Monument to the Masses, 2006
 "Disconnect", by Korn from Requiem, 2022
 "Disconnect", by Megadeth from The World Needs a Hero, 2001

Other uses
 Disconnect (software), an anti-tracker browser extension and mobile app
 Disconnector, a type of electrical switch

See also
 Disconnected (disambiguation)
 Disconnection (disambiguation)